The 39th World Science Fiction Convention (Worldcon), also known as Denvention II, was held on 3–7 September 1981 at the Sheraton Denver Downtown Hotel in Denver, Colorado, United States.

The chairmen were Suzanne Carnival and Don C. Thompson.

Participants 

Attendance was 3,792.

Guests of Honor 

 Clifford D. Simak (pro)
 C. L. Moore (pro)
 Rusty Hevelin (fan)
 Ed Bryant (toastmaster)

Awards

1981 Hugo Awards 

 Best Novel: The Snow Queen by Joan D. Vinge
 Best Novella: "Lost Dorsai" by Gordon R. Dickson
 Best Novelette: "The Cloak and the Staff" by Gordon R. Dickson
 Best Short Story: "Grotto of the Dancing Deer" by Clifford D. Simak
 Best Non-Fiction Book: Cosmos by Carl Sagan
 Best Dramatic Presentation: The Empire Strikes Back
 Best Professional Editor: Edward L. Ferman
 Best Professional Artist: Michael Whelan
 Best Fanzine: Locus, edited by Charles N. Brown
 Best Fan Writer: Susan Wood
 Best Fan Artist: Victoria Poyser

Other awards 

 Special Award: Edward L. Ferman for his effort to expand and improve the field
 John W. Campbell Award for Best New Writer: Somtow Sucharitkul

See also 

 Hugo Award
 Science fiction
 Speculative fiction
 World Science Fiction Society
 Worldcon

References

External links 

 NESFA.org: The Long List
 NESFA.org: 1981 convention notes 

1981 conferences
1981 in Colorado
1981 in the United States
Science fiction conventions in the United States
Worldcon